Asqar Quanyshuly Zhumaghaliyev (Asqar Quanyşūly Jūmağaliev; born 2 August 1972) is Kazakh politician. He was the Deputy Prime Minister of the Republic of Kazakhstan from 29 August 2017 until the government was dismissed on 25 February 2019. Zhumagaliyev was the Deputy Minister for Investment and Development of Kazakhstan, chief executive officer of Kazatomprom, Kazakhstan's uranium mining company.

Education 

Zhumagaliyev was born in 1972 in the Orenburg region of the Russian Soviet Federative Socialist Republic. He attended and graduated from the Sverdlovsk Suvorov Military School before majoring in Radio Communication, Broadcasting and Television at Satbayev Kazakh National Technical University. Subsequently, he received a second degree, in law, from the Kazakh Humanitarian Law University before graduating with a master's degree in electronic management from École Polytechnique Fédérale de Lausanne.

Career 

 Deputy Prime Minister of the Republic of Kazakhstan, Aug 2017 – Feb 2019
 CEO NAC Kazatomprom JSC, May 2015 – Present. Manages the activity of "NAC" Kazatomprom " JSC, headed by the Company's Management Board, form the strategy of development, defines the Company's prospects and directions of international cooperation, personnel policy.
 Chairman of the Agency Republic of Kazakhstan for Communications and Information, Mar 2014 – Aug 2014
 Minister of Transport and Communications of the Republic of Kazakhstan, Jan 2012 – Mar 2014
 Minister of Communications and Information of the Republic of Kazakhstan, Mar 2010 – Jan 2012
 President of JSC Kazakhtelecom, Oct 2006 – Mar 2010

References 

 
 Официальный блог Жумагалиева А.К., Министра связи и информации РК

1978 births
Living people
Ministers of Information (Kazakhstan)
Ministers of Transport and Communications (Kazakhstan)
Culture ministers
Government ministers of Kazakhstan
People from Orenburg Oblast
Deputy Prime Ministers of Kazakhstan